Chitra Bahadur Gurung (May 21, 1970November 22, 2010) was a Nepalese former swimmer, who specialized in sprint freestyle events. Gurung represented Nepal at the 2000 Summer Olympics, where he became the nation's flag bearer in the opening ceremony. He also held a Nepalese record in the 50 m freestyle.

Gurung competed only in the men's 50 m freestyle at the 2000 Summer Olympics in Sydney. He received a ticket from FINA, under a Universality program, in an entry time of 27.28. He challenged six other swimmers in heat one, including 16-year-olds Wael Ghassan of Qatar and Hassan Mubah of the Maldives. Diving in with a 0.87-second deficit, Gurung scorched the field to register a second-seeded time and a personal best of 27.02. Gurung failed to advance into the semifinals, as he placed sixty-ninth overall out of 80 swimmers in the prelims.

On November 22, 2010, Gurung was found dead in Falls Church, Virginia, as informed by the Nepal National and International Players' Association. The reason of his untimely demise was still under investigation.

References

External links
 

1970 births
2010 deaths
Nepalese male freestyle swimmers
Olympic swimmers of Nepal
Swimmers at the 2000 Summer Olympics
Swimmers at the 1998 Asian Games
Swimmers at the 2002 Asian Games
Sportspeople from Kathmandu
Nepalese Buddhists
Asian Games competitors for Nepal
Gurung people
20th-century Nepalese people